Dirk Heinen (born 3 December 1970) is a German former professional footballer who played as a goalkeeper. He works as goalkeeping coach of League of Ireland side Waterford.

Career 
Heinen played most of his matches in his nine-year stint at Bundesliga side Bayer Leverkusen, before moving to Eintracht Frankfurt. In 2002, he transferred to Süper Lig side Denizlispor, but returned to the Bundesliga after just one season there, this time joining VfB Stuttgart. There, Heinen was the substitute keeper for Timo Hildebrand. He only played three matches there, his last coming in March 2006. After injury he  was demoted to third goalkeeper behind Hildebrand and Michael Langer the following season. A German champion with Stuttgart in 2007, he announced his retirement in July 2007, subsequently emigrating to the native country of his wife Sandra, Ireland (County Waterford).

However, in January 2008 the goalkeeper was re-called to German football, moving to Arminia Bielefeld, who asked him to join them as they were short of goalkeepers in early 2008 due to injuries. On 15 March 2008, the 37-year-old made his comeback in the Bundesliga against Hannover 96 after Arminia's second keeper Rowen Fernandez was injured as well.

He retired at the end of the 2007–08 season for good. Since 2008, he is a successful goalkeeper coach in the FAI Regional Center Waterford and in 2017 Heinen was appointed as goalkeeping coach of local League of Ireland club Waterford. He achieved his goalkeeper and trainer license in Germany.

Honours
VfB Stuttgart
 Bundesliga: 2006–07

Bayer Leverkusen
 DFB-Pokal: 1992–93

References

External links 
 

1970 births
Living people
German footballers
Association football goalkeepers
Bundesliga players
2. Bundesliga players
Süper Lig players
VfB Stuttgart players
Eintracht Frankfurt players
Bayer 04 Leverkusen players
Bayer 04 Leverkusen II players
Arminia Bielefeld players
Denizlispor footballers
German expatriate footballers
German expatriate sportspeople in Turkey
Expatriate footballers in Turkey
Footballers from Cologne